The 2016 Manipur State League was the 11th season of the Manipur State League, the top-division football league in the Indian state of Manipur. The league began on 24 August 2016 and ended on 25 November with the final. NEROCA emerged as champions.

Teams
 Anouba Imagee Mangal
 Keinou Library & Sports Association
 Nambul Mapal Athletics & Cultural Organisation
 North Imphal Sporting Association
 NEROCA
 Sagolband United
 Southern Sporting Union
 Tiddim Road Athletics Union
 Tiddim Road Unique Gamy Players Union
 Young Physique Union
 United Sporting Association
 F.C. Zalen

League table

Final

End-of-season awards

References

Manipur State League
2016–17 in Indian football leagues